Dianne Quander is an American songwriter, best known for writing the song "Caught Up In The Rapture," with her writing partner Garry Glenn which was recorded by Anita Baker.  She also collaborated  on songs of various artists including "Take You To Heaven" by Earth, Wind and Fire,  "Why Not Me" by Phyllis Hyman, "Flame of Love" by Jean Carne and "Sweet Control" by Jon Lucien.

Biography
Dianne Quander is a native of Washington, D.C.  She graduated from Howard University with a BA degree in Journalism and Television and Film.  She worked at Radio Station WHUR FM  in DC as a news reporter and then as an on-air personality (DJ).  After WHUR she moved to St. Thomas in the U.S. Virgin Islands where she worked at Radio Station WSTA playing a mix of  R&B, Jazz, pop and rock music. After a year in St. Thomas, Dianne moved back to Washington DC  and worked at the Pacific radio station WPFW playing music on the late night early morning shift. She soon moved to Los Angeles to pursue a writing career as a lyricist.  Dianne met her musical soul mate Garry Glenn and they signed a publishing deal with  Warner Brothers Music/Warner Chappell and collaborated on songs for a number of artists. Dianne and Garry both branched out on their own and she collaborated with writer-producers such as Maurice White, George Duke, Hiroshima, David Cochran, Jermaine Jackson, John Barnes, Jeff Lorber and Stephanie Spruill and more. Dianne was with Warner Chappell for 8 years.

Selected songwriting credits:  "Cross Your Mind" (George Howard), "Steppin into the Night" (movie Armed and Dangerous), "Stay with Love" (The Jackson's mini-series), "Mind Blowin'" (The Whispers), "Just Another Lonely Night" (Johnny Gill), "Crazy Bout Your Lovin'" (Robert Brookins), "Finding My Way Back to You" (Chante Moore).

References

External links
ASCAP

Living people
21st-century African-American people
21st-century African-American women
Songwriters from Washington, D.C.
American women songwriters
Quander family
Howard University alumni
African-American women musicians
Year of birth missing (living people)